Elliot Liebow (1925–1994) was an American urban anthropologist and ethnographer. His works include Tally's Corner and Tell Them Who I Am, both micro-sociological writings that were participant observer studies of people in poor areas.  He also served as chief of the Center for the Study of Work and Mental Health at the National Institute of Mental Health.

Tally's Corner served as Liebow's PhD dissertation for Catholic University of America. The book has been considered a "classic" ethnography of black street-corner society in Washington DC featuring the narratives of young unemployed and casually employed black men about work, their families, friends and themselves.  It has sold more than a million copies. However, the book has also been widely criticized for failing to explore or acknowledge the constraints of institutional and systemic racism on the lives and social conditions of Black people.

Liebow was also a poet.

Tell Them Who I Am accounts the everyday life of homeless women in Washington D.C. Liebow's purpose for the book was to "write a straight forward description of shelter life," "see the world of homelessness as homeless women see and experience it," and explain "how these women remained human in the face of inhuman conditions."

References

Ethnographers
Catholic University of America alumni
1925 births
1994 deaths
20th-century American non-fiction writers